A&W is a fast food restaurant chain in Canada, franchised by A&W Food Services of Canada, Inc. The chain was originally part of the U.S.-based A&W Restaurants chain; locations in Canada were sold to Unilever in 1972, and then bought by its management in 1995. A&W restaurants in Canada no longer have any corporate connection to A&W operations outside of Canada.

The Canadian operation is privately held and is based in North Vancouver, British Columbia. In 2022, A&W was Canada's second-largest fast food restaurant burger chain with 1,029 franchises, after McDonald's with 1,452 franchises.

History
The first Canadian A&W restaurant opened in Winnipeg, Manitoba, in 1956. The Canadian restaurants were part of the American chain until 1972 when they were sold to Unilever.

In 1975, facing competition from the growing Canadian operations of McDonald's, the company launched what was to have been a temporary advertising campaign starring an orange-clad mascot, The Great Root Bear. The bear and the tuba jingle that accompanied him became a long-running campaign (the tune, entitled "Ba-Dum, Ba-Dum", was released as a single by Attic Records, credited to "Major Ursus", a play on Ursa Major or "great bear"). The famous Canadian composer and B.C. Hall of Fame winner Robert Buckley helped compose the song. The mascot was so successful that he was eventually adopted as the mascot by the American A&W chain as well. The famous tuba jingle was played by famed Vancouver jazz, classical and session trombonist Sharman King. King also did the ads for the "Book Warehouse" chain of discount book stores, which he owned.

In the early 1980s, the drive-in style of restaurant was phased out. It was replaced with a modern, pastel-coloured fast food outlet which included marginally healthier options. While the chain continued to open some standalone restaurants, A&W also aggressively pursued shopping mall locations, and as a result A&Ws are still commonly found in Canadian malls of various sizes.

Management buyout and retro theming (1995–2001)
In 1995, the chain was bought from Unilever by senior management. During 1997 and 1998, Drew Carey served as a spokesperson for the chain, appearing in TV ads alongside the Great Root Bear; he was dismissed (with legal action ensuing) after a November 1998 episode of The Drew Carey Show featured Carey eating at a McDonald's location in China.

By the end of the 1990s, marketing and products began to take on a more retro approach. Former menu items, such as the Burger Family, were reintroduced, and marketing became more targeted toward the baby boomer generation. The Great Root Bear and (in English Canada) the "ba-dum ba-dum" theme were also retired from most advertising (the tuba theme is still used in French-language ads). A new restaurant design was introduced, featuring a bright orange and yellow exterior, reminiscent of the 1950s, while the interior is decorated with memorabilia associated with the same period. Existing restaurants were renovated to match the new style. Meanwhile, with malls in decline, A&W began to focus on opening new standalone restaurants, particularly in smaller markets where McDonald's was often the only major hamburger chain. The last drive-in style restaurant closed in 2000, in Langley, British Columbia.

In 2001, Allen Lulu appeared in an A&W commercial for the first time. He continues to appear in TV ads at present.

Stock market listing and "Good Food" focus (2002–present)
On February 15, 2002, the A&W Revenue Royalties Income Fund was listed on the Toronto Stock Exchange. The initial public offering was 8.34 million units at $10 each. The fund owns the A&W trademarks in Canada and licenses them to A&W Food Services of Canada Inc. Revenue is generated by charging a three percent royalty on gross sales of each restaurant. Television advertisements are filmed at locations in the Fraser Valley. In June 2006, A&W celebrated 50 years in Canada. Some Quebec locations had Dunkin' Donuts locations until Dunkin' Donuts closed most locations in Quebec.

Two new restaurant concepts were introduced in the fall of 2009. The new standalone restaurant design is ultra modern but with some architectural markings reminiscent of the design in the earlier buildings erect from A&W back in time. There is also a new separate format for urban (i.e., downtown) locations, where some of the baby-boomer aspects are scaled back in favour of a more modern look. On November 21, 2013, the chain opened its 800th location in downtown Montreal. The company's advertising also shifted to a focus on animal welfare, such as chicken and beef raised without antibiotics.

In February 2018, Susan Senecal became the company's chief executive officer.

In June 2018, A&W announced that they were replacing plastic straws in their locations with paper ones, becoming the first fast food chain in North America to make the switch.

Products

Apart from the namesake brand of root beer, the A&W menu is focused on "The Burger Family", a lineup of hamburgers introduced by the U.S. A&W chain in the early 1960s, mostly discontinued in the 1980s in favour of a more standard menu, then reintroduced in Canada and expanded upon beginning in the late 1990s.

The Burger Family

The original Burger Family lineup consists of the Baby, Mama, Teen, and Papa burgers.  They are still sold today along with other burgers named after other family members:
Baby Burger: small beef patty, ketchup, unseeded hamburger bun, (optional) cheese slice
Mama Burger: regular beef patty, onion slice, pickles, ketchup, mustard, Teen Sauce, sesame seed bun, (optional) cheese slice
Teen Burger: regular beef patty, onion slice, pickles, ketchup, mustard, bacon, Teen Sauce, lettuce, tomato, sesame seed bun, cheese slice
Papa Burger: two regular beef patties ( total), onion slice, pickles, ketchup, mustard, Teen Sauce, sesame seed bun, (optional) cheese slice
Grandpa Burger: three regular beef patties ( total), onion slice, pickles, ketchup, mustard, Teen Sauce, sesame seed bun, (optional) cheese slice
Uncle Burger: large beef patty, red onion slice, pickles, ketchup, Chubby mayo, Uncle Sauce, lettuce, tomato, sesame seed bun, cheese slice x2
Double Teen Burger regular beef patty (×2),onion slice, pickles, ketchup, mustard, bacon, Teen Sauce, lettuce, tomato, sesame seed bun, cheese slice
Discontinued members of the Burger Family include the Grandma Burger, a prime rib burger topped with caramelized onions and horseradish sauce; and the Sirloin Burger Twins, which were a pair of sliders.

Chubby Chicken
Another 1960s-era offering, Chubby Chicken, returned to the menu shortly after the reintroduction of the Burger Family.
Chubby burgers are breaded all white-meat chicken breasts. There are three varieties offered: 
The Original Chubby Burger which is made on sesame seed bun, and comes with Chubby Mayo (Hellmann's Mayo), and lettuce.
The Spicy Habanero Chicken Burger is made on a seeded bun with a spicy chicken portion, and comes with jalapeño aioli, lettuce and tomato.
BLT Chubby Burger is made on a 7-grain bun, and comes with Chubby Mayo (Hellmann's Mayo), two slices of bacon, lettuce, and tomato.
These can be ordered by themselves, or in combos. They also offer all white-meat chicken strips which come in either 3 or 5, by themselves, or in combos. The chicken strips may also be ordered in wraps such as the "Chipotle Chicken wrap" and the "Bacon Ranch wrap". Some locations used to offer fried chicken bone-in pieces however, the bone in chicken was discontinued as an optional item in 2020.

Value Menu 
In 2012, A&W introduced its first value burger, the Buddy Burger, and its double patty variant, the Double Buddy burger. Both can be ordered with or without cheese. The release of the Buddy burger made A&W more competitive against McDonald's, who already had value burgers like the McDouble.

In 2015, A&W piloted the new Chicken Buddy burger at some select locations. It was successful and was added to the value menu permanently in 2016.

Buddy Burger: one or two small beef patties, mustard, ketchup, Teen Sauce, grilled onions, unseeded hamburger bun; available in double or single patty versions, and with cheese or without cheese.
Chicken Buddy Burger: one or two breaded chicken patties, mayonnaise, pickles, unseeded hamburger bun; value burgers, available in double or single patty versions

Breakfast 
A&W launched a revamped version of their breakfast offering in the summer of 2014. In addition to the Bacon N' Egger (called Chef-d'œuf in Quebec), Sausage N' Egger, and Classic Bacon N' Eggs, they launched several new items including The All-Canadian Special and pancakes. Customers can choose to have their breakfast sandwiches made with either English muffins or with buns. In 2017, A&W announced that it would offer their breakfast sandwiches as part of an
All-Day Breakfast Menu to compete with McDonald's.

Beyond Meat 
In July 2018, A&W locations began serving Beyond Meat's vegan Beyond Burger. The chain had a shortage of the Beyond Burger in August 2018, but announced that all locations would receive stock by October 2018. In 2019 A&W expanded its Beyond Meat offerings with the release of the Beyond Meat Sausage N' Egger.
Beyond Meat Burger: Beyond Meat patty, mustard, ketchup, mayonnaise, red onion, pickles, lettuce, tomato, sesame seed bun, A&W seasoning
Beyond Meat Sausage N' Egger: Beyond Meat sausage patty, margarine, egg, cheddar cheese, English muffin

Other products

A&W also sells their Mozza Burger, which is not part of the burger family nor the value menu. It consists of a beef patty, lettuce, tomato, bacon, mozzarella cheese, and their special Mozza sauce on a sesame seed bun. 

Discontinued offerings include Bone-in Chubby Chicken (sold in 2-3 piece combos, buckets of 10, with a "family box" of fries/onion rings, and a side of potato salad/coleslaw (also discontinued options)), discontinued members of the Burger Family: Grandma Burger, a prime rib burger topped with caramelized onions and horseradish sauce; and the Sirloin Burger Twins, which were a pair of sliders, the Veggie Deluxe (veggie burger with mozzarella cheese, lettuce, tomato, onion, and pickles), traditional hot dogs, and the Whistle Dog (topped with cheese and bacon). 

Available sides include french fries, poutine, and thick-cut onion rings. Fries are default in combos, the other sides can be substituted for an additional charge. Fries have salt added by default. You can request no salt fries but they will be a wait. Sweet potato fries have been added to the menu in some locations. The sweet potato fries are served with a small container of chipotle mayo. There is also a sweet potato poutine option available at locations serving sweet potato fries. Sweet potato fries do not come with salt added. All sides can also have "seasoning salt" added to them as well (the seasoning salt added by default to A&W onion rings). Though it is considered a breakfast item, you can potentially order hash brown (patties) as well.

Drinks include A&W Root Beer (and A&W Diet Root Beer) and other Coca-Cola soft drinks (Coca-Cola, Diet Coke, (Coke Zero is also available in some locations), Sprite), Gold Peak Iced Tea (not Nestle or Brisk), apple juice, orange juice, lemonade, milk, chocolate milk, along with hot chocolate (at some locations), tea, organic Van Houtte coffee, milkshakes (at some locations: flavour options include Vanilla, Strawberry, Chocolate, and yes, Root Beer), smoothies and Frozen A&W Root Beer. The A&W ice cream floats continue to be offered in some restaurants (made with pre-portioned scoops of frozen ice cream by Nestlé). There is speculation the new Brew Bar might replace that fan favourite though.

The ketchup and mustard served at A&W location are processed by French's at their Ontario facility and use only Canadian ingredients.

The Whistle Dog, a hot dog dressed with cheese, bacon and relish, was available in Canada, but was discontinued at the end of 2016; the regular hot dog was similarly discontinued. In July 2022, all Canadian A&W locations brought back the Whistle Dog for a limited time.

Divergences with A&W (Great American Brand)
The Canadian menu diverges significantly from their international counterparts franchised through A Great American Brand. This divergence is due to the brand's separate management and ownership. The only Burger Family product available by name in U.S. locations is the Papa Burger. The Papa Burger differs significantly between Canada and the U.S., adding lettuce, tomato and cheese slices to resemble the Canadian Teen Burger. Notable products on the U.S. menu not available in Canada include deep-fried cheese curds and soft serve-based products such as sundaes.

Animal welfare
The chicken and eggs served at A&W are from hens who lived in enriched cages and were fed a vegetarian diet, as chickens are omnivores. Antibiotics are only used in the company's animals when medically necessary, and those animals are taken out of production. All pork comes from Canadian suppliers and thus no longer use gestation crates (as it's been banned since 2014). Moreover, A&W claims to be trying to use 100% open housing by 2021. A&W has also announced plans for their meat production to meet Global Animal Partnership's level 2 certification, but did not provide a timeline.

Trademark
The A&W trademarks are owned by A&W Trade Marks Limited Partnership. The Partnership licenses the trademarks to A&W Food Services of Canada Inc. in exchange for a royalty of 3% of the sales of A&W restaurants in Canada. A&W Food Services owns ~21% of A&W Trade Marks Inc. which is the sole general partner in the Partnership, while the rest is owned by A&W Revenue Royalties Income Fund.

See also
 List of hamburger restaurants

References

External links 
 
 A&W Canada radio jingle from the late 1960s (MP3)

1956 establishments in Manitoba
Companies listed on the Toronto Stock Exchange
Companies based in North Vancouver
Drive-in restaurants
Fast-food chains of Canada
Fast-food hamburger restaurants
Restaurants established in 1956
Root beer stands
Companies formed by management buyout
1972 mergers and acquisitions
2002 initial public offerings
Restaurants in Manitoba